These are the official results of the Men's Triple Jump event at the 1995 IAAF World Championships in Gothenburg, Sweden. There were a total number of 44 participating athletes, with two qualifying groups and the final held on Monday August 7, 1995.

Almost three weeks before this championship, Jonathan Edwards had just marginally improved upon Willie Banks' ten year old world record (17.97m), by jumping 17.98m in Salamanca. In the preliminary round he was not even the #1 qualifier, edged out by Jérôme Romain. On his first trip down the runway in the final, Edwards became the first athlete in the world to jump further than 18 metres without wind assistance, registering a world record jump of 18.16 m. It took more than 20 years for Christian Taylor to become the first man to jump beyond Edwards' first record.

Schedule
All times are Central European Time (UTC+1)

Results

Qualifying round
Held on Saturday 1995-08-05Qualifying standard: 17.10 metres

Final

See also
 1993 Men's World Championships Triple Jump
 1996 Men's Olympic Triple Jump
 1997 Men's World Championships Triple Jump

References
 Results

T
Triple jump at the World Athletics Championships